Quentin Johnston (born September 6, 2001) is an American football wide receiver for the TCU Horned Frogs.

Early life and high school
Johnston grew up in Temple, Texas, and attended Temple High School. He was rated a four-star recruit and initially committed to play college football at Texas. Johnston later flipped his commitment to TCU, citing the dismissal of Texas wide receivers coach Drew Mehringer as the reason.

College career
Johnston became a starter at TCU as a true freshman, catching 22 passes for a team-high 487 yards and two touchdowns. His 22.1 average yards per catch was the highest by a true freshman in the history of the Big 12 Conference. Johnston was named first team All-Big 12 as a sophomore after catching 33 passes and leading TCU with 612 receiving yards and six touchdown receptions. On January 16, 2023, Johnston announced that he would forgo his senior season and enter the 2023 NFL Draft.

References

External links

TCU Horned Frogs bio

Living people
Players of American football from Texas
American football wide receivers
TCU Horned Frogs football players
2001 births